Judah Leib ben Isaac of Szydłów (Hebrew: יהודה לייב בן יצחק משדלוב; d. 1730) was an 18th-century Polish rabbi who served as a representative of Kraków in the Council of Four Lands.

Biography 
Born in Szydłów, Poland to and old and distinguished rabbinic family form Przemyśl. His father Isaac ben Samuel Zak was the Chief Rabbi of Przemyśl and later Krakow. His mother was the daughter of Joshua Höschel ben Joseph. In his early years, Judah Leib officiated as rabbi in Szydłów later serving as representative of Kraków in the Council of Four Lands. After 1715 he became rabbi and president of the Yeshiva at Kraków, where he remained till his death in 1730. His son, David Samuel served as the Av Beit Din of Szydłów and is the paternal grandfather Shmuel of Karov.

References 

1730 deaths
18th-century Polish rabbis